Kang Byung-chan (Korean: 강병찬; born 1951 in South Korea; died 2002 in South Korea) was a South Korean football manager who last worked as head coach of the Bhutan national football team. Besides South Korea, he managed in Bhutan.| He was a former player.

Career
Byung-chan started his managerial career with Korea Housing & Commercial Bank. In 2000, he was appointed head coach of the Bhutan national football team, a position he held until 2002.

References

External links
 'Bhutan's Hiddink' Director Kang Byeong-chan
 Bhutan Football Council' Second Kang Byung-chan' 
 “I have a second director, Kang Byeong-chan”
 'Final' Bhutan, World Cup miracle… After that, Korean devotion 
 National-Football-Teams Profile

South Korean expatriate football managers
Bhutan national football team managers
1951 births
2002 deaths
Deaths in South Korea
South Korean footballers
South Korea international footballers
South Korean football managers
Expatriate football managers in Bhutan
Association footballers not categorized by position